Michael Rabold (March 12, 1937 -October 13, 1970) was an American football offensive guard who played eight years in the National Football League. He played college football at Indiana University and finished second in the 1958 voting for the Chicago Tribune Silver Football award. He died in a car crash in 1970.

References

1937 births
1970 deaths
Players of American football from Chicago
American football offensive guards
Indiana Hoosiers football players
Detroit Lions players
St. Louis Cardinals (football) players
Minnesota Vikings players
Chicago Bears players